1096 Gang is a Filipino hip hop group from Mandaluyong City consisting of Ghetto G., Lucy J., Guddhist, Young Wise, and Polo Pi that was formed in 2018. The group was successful mainstream for their hit song "Pajama Party" which went viral on Tiktok and was released in 2020. The group was originally formed as underground hip hop collective and other several hit songs such as "Galing", "Matsalab", and "Break the Loop".

Members 
 Ghetto G. - rapper 
 Lucy J. - rapper 
 Guddhist - rapper 
 Young Wise - rapper 
 Polo Pi - rapper

Discography

Singles

Filmography 
Television
 Wowowin, 2021

References 

Filipino hip hop groups
Musical groups established in 2018